A round (also called a perpetual canon [canon perpetuus] or infinite canon) is a musical composition, a limited type of canon, in which a minimum of three voices sing exactly the same melody at the unison (and may continue repeating it indefinitely), but with each voice beginning at different times so that different parts of the melody coincide in the different voices, but nevertheless fit harmoniously together. It is one of the easiest forms of part singing, as only one line of melody need be learned by all parts, and is part of a popular musical tradition. They were particularly favoured in glee clubs, which combined amateur singing with regular drinking. The earliest known rounds date from 12th century Europe. One characteristic of rounds is that, "There is no fixed ending," in the sense that they may be repeated as many times as possible, although many do have "fixed" endings, often indicated by a fermata.

"Row, Row, Row Your Boat" is a well-known children's round for four voices. Other well-known examples are "Frère Jacques", "Three Blind Mice", and, more recently, the outro of "God Only Knows" by The Beach Boys.

A catch is a round in which a phrase that is not apparent in a single line of lyrics emerges when the lyrics are split between the different voices. "Perpetual canon" refers to the end of the melody leading back to the beginning, allowing easy and immediate repetition. Often, "the final cadence is the same as the first measure".

History

The term "round" first appears in English in the early 16th century, though the form was found much earlier. In medieval England, they were called rota or rondellus. Later, an alternative term was "roundel" (e.g., David Melvill's manuscript Ane Buik off Roundells, Aberdeen, 1612). Special types of rounds are the "catch" (a comic English form found from about 1580 to 1800), and a specialized use of the word "canon", in 17th- and 18th-century England designating rounds with religious texts. The oldest surviving round in English is "Sumer Is Icumen In"  , which is for four voices, plus two bass voices singing a ground (that is, a never-changing repeating part), also in canon. However, the earliest known rounds are two works with Latin texts found in the eleventh fascicle of the Notre Dame manuscript Pluteo 29.1. They are Leto leta concio (a two-voice round) and O quanto consilio (a four-voice round). The former dates from before 1180 and may be of German origin. The first published rounds in English were printed by Thomas Ravenscroft in 1609... "Three Blind Mice"  appears in this collection, although in a somewhat different form from today's children's round:

Mechanics

What makes a round work is that after the work is divided into equal-sized blocks of a few measures each, corresponding notes in each block either are the same, or are different notes in the same chord. This is easiest with one chord, as in "Row, Row, Row Your Boat":

A new part can join the singing by starting at the beginning whenever another part reaches any asterisk in the above music. If one ignores the sixteenth notes that pass between the main chords, every single note is in the tonic triad—in this case, a C, E, or G.

Many rounds involve more than one chord, as in "Frère Jacques" :

The texture is simpler, but it uses a few more notes; this can perhaps be more easily seen if all four parts are run together into the same two measures:

The second beat of each measure does not sketch out a tonic triad, it outlines a dominant seventh chord (or "V7 chord").

Classical

Serious composers who turned their hand to the round format include Thomas Arne, John Blow, William Byrd, Henry Purcell, Louis Hardin, Joseph Haydn, Wolfgang Amadeus Mozart, Ludwig van Beethoven, and Benjamin Britten (for example, "Old Joe Has Gone Fishing", sung by the villagers in the pub to keep the peace, at the end of act 1 of Peter Grimes) . Examples by J. S. Bach include the regular canons, Var. 3 and Var. 24 of the Goldberg Variations, and the perpetual canons, Canon 7 of The Musical Offering and Canon a 2 Perpetuus (BWV 1075). Several rounds are included amongst Arnold Schoenberg's thirty-plus canons, which "within their natural limitations ... are brilliant pieces, containing too much of the composer's characteristically unexpected blend of seriousness, humour, vigour and tenderness to remain unperformed".

See also

 Pervading imitation
 Voice crossing
 Voice exchange

References

Sources 

 
 
 .
 
 
 
 
 
 
 
 

Musical terminology
Song forms